Paweł Gaca (5 October 1917 – 11 August 2008) was a Polish gymnast. He competed in eight events at the 1952 Summer Olympics.

References

1917 births
2008 deaths
Polish male artistic gymnasts
Olympic gymnasts of Poland
Gymnasts at the 1952 Summer Olympics
People from Wodzisław Śląski
20th-century Polish people